Dawood Sarkhosh (also spelled as Daud Sarkhosh) born 26 April 1971 in Daykundi (Bandar & Sang Takht district), Afghanistan, is an ethnic Hazara singer, musician and poet.

Early life 
Sarkhosh's inspiration was his older brother Sarwar Sarkhosh, a nationalist and legendary musician of his times who was killed during the civil war. Sarkhosh learned playing dambura and singing from him at the age of seventeen. After the death of his brother Sarkhosh migrated to Pakistan first to Peshawar city then moved to Quetta, Pakistan.

Career 
Sarkhosh revived his skills by singing and composing songs inspired by a sense of nationalism and suffering in exile. He did not sing for commercial gain, but out of nostalgia and to convey the feelings about refugee life as experienced by refugees of Afghanistan dispersed throughout the world. They went to his concerts in their thousands, marking Sarkhosh's rise as a singer. It was in Quetta that he mastered the harmonium under the Pakistani composer Arbab Ali Khan.

Personal life 
Dawood Sarkhosh is married to Kubra Nekzad Sarkhosh with three children; Saboor, Zulfiqar and Yasir. They now live in Austria Vienna.

Discography 
 1998: Sarzamin-e-Man (My Homeland).
 2000: Parijo (Fairy).
 2004: Sapid-o-Siah (Black and White).
 2005: Khana-e-Gilli (Mud House).
 2007: Oslo Concert
 2008: Maryam (Maryam a girl's name).
 2010: Bazi (Game/play).
 2016: Jang-o-jonoon (War and madness, war and insanity) released by Sarkhosh Music inc Canada.
 2016: concert in the capital cities of Australia.
 December 2017 concert in the capital cities of Canada
 2019: concert in Finland, Austria, Sweden.
 2019: Man o To, (Me and You).
 2019: concert in the capital cities of Australia and New Zealand.

See also 
 Sarwar Sarkhosh
 List of Hazara people
 Hazara diaspora

References

External links 

 Dawood Sarkhosh's official website
 

1971 births
Living people
Hazara singers
Dombra players
People from Quetta
Afghan male singers
Persian-language singers
People from Daykundi Province
20th-century Afghan male singers
Austrian people of Hazara descent
Afghan expatriate musicians in Pakistan